Al Hamamah is a village on the coast of eastern Libya, some  north of Al Bayda. Roads are connecting her with Al Bayda (to the south) and with Al Haniya to the west. There is an imperfect track between her and Susa (to the east). 

Populated places in Jabal al Akhdar